The Sunshine Millions is a series of American races for thoroughbred horses held in January at Santa Anita Park in Arcadia, California or at Gulfstream Park in Hallandale Beach, Florida. The brainchild of prominent horseman Frank Stronach, when it first began, half of the eight Sunshine Millions races are run at one track and half at the other. Beginning in 2012, the revamped version of the Sunshine Millions feature six races at Gulfstream Park in Hallandale Beach, Florida, exclusively for Florida-breds, with a combined purse of $1.3 million.
The series now consists of the:
 Sunshine Millions Classic
 Sunshine Millions Turf Stakes
 Sunshine Millions Distaff
 Sunshine Millions Filly & Mare Turf
 Sunshine Millions Sprint
 Sunshine Millions Turf Sprint

The series originally consisted of the:
 Sunshine Millions Oaks
 Sunshine Millions Dash
 Sunshine Millions Distaff
 Sunshine Millions Filly & Mare Sprint
 Sunshine Millions Sprint
 Sunshine Millions Filly & Mare Turf
 Sunshine Millions Turf Stakes
 Sunshine Millions Classic

References
 Horse-races.net article
 2011 Gulfstream Park Press Release

External links
 Ten Things You Should Know about the Sunshine Millions at Hello Race Fans!

Horse races in Florida
Horse races in California